Košarkaški klub Ergonom, commonly referred to as KK Ergonom, was a men's professional basketball club based in Niš, Serbia. The club used to compete in the top-tiers YUBA League and Basketball League of Serbia. Their home arena was the Čair Sports Center.

History 
The club was founded on 13 May 1970 in Niš, SR Serbia. On 25 April 1971, the lost their inaugural game to Jagodina. During the 1983–84 season, the club was dissolved. In 1999, the club was re-established under the same name. 

In 2003, the club won the 2nd-tier Cup of Serbia and god qualified for the 2003 Radivoj Korać Cup.

Home arena 

Ergonom used to play its home games at the Čair Sports Center. The hall is located in Niš and was built in 1974. It has a seating capacity of 4,000 seats.

Players

Coaches

  Dragan Tomanović (1999–2001)
  Ljubomir Poček (2001–2002)
  Srećko Sekulović (2002–2005)
  Predrag Jaćimović (2005–2008)
  Ljubiša Aničić (2008)
  Vlada Jovanović (2008–2009)
  Jovica Antonić (2009–2010)

Season by season

Trophies and awards

Trophies 
YUBA B League (2nd-tier)
Runners-up (1): 2002–03
League Cup of Serbia (2nd-tier)
Winner (1): 2002–03
Runners-up (1): 2004–05

Notable players

  Raško Katić
  Vladimir Đokić
  Marko Simonović
  Aleksej Nešović
  Srdjan Stanković

See also 
 OKK Konstantin
 KK Fair Play

References

External links
 Statistics at srbijasport.net

Defunct basketball teams in Serbia
Basketball teams in Yugoslavia
Basketball teams established in 1970
Basketball teams established in 1999
1982 establishments in Yugoslavia
Basketball teams disestablished in 1984
Basketball teams disestablished in 2011
Sport in Niš